Wilfrid North (16 January 1863 – 3 June 1935), also spelled Wilfred North, was an Anglo-American film director, actor, and writer of the silent film era. He directed 102 films, including short films; acted in 43 films; and wrote the story for three films.

Biography
Wilfrid North was born in London on 16 January 1863. A stage actor long before entering films, North had appeared on Broadway in 1899 with Mrs. Fiske and Maurice Barrymore in Becky Sharp and with Julia Marlowe in 1901 in When Knighthood was in Flower.

North joined Vitagraph Studios as a director in 1912. Vitagraph appointed him the director of films of its comedy star, John Bunny. North directed several films of the Bunny series like Bunny's Honeymoon, Bunny Versus Cutey, Bunny and the Bunny Hug, Bunny's Birthday Surprise, Bunny as a Reporter, Bunny's Dilemma and Bunny for the Cause, earning him popularity in the Vitagraph Studios, which led to his appointment as the supervising director of the company's studio in Brooklyn in 1917.

Actress Anita Stewart, who had started her acting career at Vitagraph and had acted in several films directed by her brother-in-law Ralph Ince, felt that the new director, North, was incompetent in his work, and went on strike during the production of two films. However, when Stewart had set up her own production company called Anita Stewart Productions, she acted in the 1919 film Human Desire, directed by North.

In September 1913 North was temporarily blinded as a result of a yacht-cannon that exploded prematurely during the principal photography of the film Miss Tomboy and Freckles. The incident happened at the Atlantic Yacht Club in Sea Gate, New York when the film crew was preparing for the filming of a yacht race. It was believed that spark from one of the actor's cigarettes had caused the explosion. North's face was badly burnt as he was pouring flour into the cannon. He recovered and returned to work on the film on 15 October.

Along with J. Stuart Blackton he directed Vitagraph's controversial 1915 war film The Battle Cry of Peace, based on the book Defenseless America by Hudson Maxim, which called on the United States to enter World War I against Germany.

In 1920 another film production studio, Select Pictures, signed him as director. North worked for Select Pictures for a short period of time but eventually returned to Vitagraph, which made him the company's production manager. Among the most famous of North's later films was His Brother's Keeper (filmed in 1920 but released in 1921), a crime horror film, now considered lost, starring Martha Mansfield and Albert Barrett in the lead roles. After the introduction of talkies, North started playing supporting roles in films, especially the characters of judges, which he played in Port of Dreams (1929), No More Children (1929), The Trial of Mary Dugan (1929), Girl Overboard (1929), Red-Headed Woman (1932), The Washington Masquerade (1932), Unashamed (1932), The Penguin Pool Murder (1932), and The Defense Rests (1934). His last film was Diamond Jim, in which he played a stockbroker.

North also acted in and directed various plays for theatre. He directed the 1917 stageplay Daybreak, written by Jane Cowl and Jane Murfin, and produced by Selwyn & Co. The play was staged in Harris Theatre from 14 August 1917 to October 1917.

Personal
North married actress Marian F. Gragg (1887–1945). He died on 3 June 1935 in Hollywood.

His 1931 film Corianton: A Story of Unholy Love was screened at the 13th LDS Film Festival in 2014.

Selected filmography

Director 

 Corianton: A Story of Unholy Love (1931)
 Mrs. Dane's Danger (1922)
 Lucky Carson (1921)
 The Mind the Paint Girl
 The Battle Cry of Peace
 Out of the Storm (1913)
 Millionaire for a Day
 His Brother's Keeper (1921)
 A Dream of Fair Women (1920)
 The Undercurrent (1919)
 Human Desire (1919)
 Over the Top (1918)
 Clover's Rebellion (1917)
 Sally in a Hurry
 Dimple's Baby
 Kitty MacKay
 Indiscretion (1917)
 The Dollar and the Law (1916)
 The Blue Envelope Mystery
 The Kid
 Hesper of the Mountains
 The Ordeal of Elizabeth
 Salvation Joan
 Green Stockings (1916)
 A 'Model' Wife (1915)
 The Shabbies
 Lillian's Husbands
 Dimples and the Ring
 The Honeymoon Pact
 The Silent W
 The Little Doll's Dressmaker
 Playing the Game
 Dimples, the Auto Salesman
 To Save Him for His Wife
 A Lily in Bohemia
 The Guttersnipe
 The Love Whip
 Lifting the Ban of Coventry
 The Capitulation of the Major
 Peggy of Fifth Avenue
 Breaking In
 Hearts and the Highway (1915)
 Arthur Truman's Ward (1914)
 The Methods of Margaret
 Miss Tomboy and Freckles
 In the Land of Arcadia
 A Costume Piece
 A Close Call
 The Lost Cord
 Lily of the Valley
 The New Stenographer
 The Winning Trick
 Bread Upon the Waters
 Lillian's Dilemma
 The Persistent Mr. Prince
 The Ladies' War
 The Accomplished Mrs. Thompson
 Eve's Daughter
 The Boys of the I.O.U.
 Cutey's Wife
 The Awakening of Barbara Dare
 Fanny's Melodrama
 The Chicken Inspector
 Love, Luck and Gasoline
 Art for a Heart
 The Speeder's Revenge
 Doctor Polly
 The Street Singers (1914)
 The Life Saver (1913)
 Matrimonial Manoeuvres
 The Mystery of the Silver Skull
 Bunny for the Cause
 Sauce for the Goose
 Fortune's Turn
 When Women Go on the Warpath; or, Why Jonesville Went Dry
 The Clown and the Prima Donna
 The Feudists
 The Intruder
 When Society Calls
 The Only Way
 Hubby's Toothache
 The Carpenter
 A Millinery Bomb
 Love's Quarantine
 One Good Joke Deserves Another
 Bunny's Dilemma
 His Tired Uncle
 His House in Order; or, The Widower's Quest
 Bunny as a Reporter
 Bunny's Birthday Surprise
 Bunny and the Bunny Hug
 Cupid's Hired Man
 Disciplining Daisy
 Bunny Versus Cutey
 The Stronger Sex
 Seeing Double
 The Fortune
 Bunny's Honeymoon (1913)
 On Her Wedding Day (1912)

Actor 

 Mrs. Dane's Danger (1916) - David Dane
 The Son of Wallingford (1921) - J. Rufus Wallingford
 The Love Brand (1923) - Peter Collier
 The Huntress (1923) - John Gladding
 The Drivin' Fool (1923) - Howard Grayson
 A Man's Mate (1924) - Monsieur Bonard
 Captain Blood (1924) - Col. Bishop
 The Beloved Brute (1924) - Fat Milligan
 On Thin Ice (1925) - Harrison Breen
 The Happy Warrior (1925) - Mr. Letham
 Perils of the Rail (1925) - Pepper Martin
 Hell-Bent for Heaven (1926) - Matt Hunt - Sid's Father
 The Belle of Broadway (1926) - Major Anstruthers - an Old Beau
 Marriage License? (1926) - Judge (uncredited)
Oh, What a Night! (1926) - Dean Simpson
 Tongues of Scandal (1927) - Mr. Collett
 Tracked by the Police (1927) - Tom Bradley
 The Bush Leaguer (1927) - Stokes
 The Fourflusher (1928) - Mr. Stone
 The Terrible People (1928, Serial) - Godley Long
 Captain Careless (1928) - John Forsythe
 The Trial of Mary Dugan (1929) - Judge Nash
 The Girl Who Wouldn't Wait (1929) - Warden
 No More Children (1929) - Judge Stanton
 Port of Dreams (1929) - Judge
 Street Girl (1929) - Man with Prince Nicholaus (uncredited)
 The Dude Wrangler (1930) - The 'Snorer'
 Beau Ideal (1931) -French Officer (uncredited)
 Private Lives (1931) - Sibyl's Wedding Escort (uncredited)
 Red-Headed Woman (1932) - Judge at Divorce Hearing (uncredited)
 The Widow in Scarlet (1932) - Pete's pal
 Unashamed (1932) - Judge Ambrose
 The Washington Masquerade (1932) - Judge Sampson (uncredited)
 Penguin Pool Murder (1932) - Judge
 Cavalcade (1933) - Man Talking to Colonel (uncredited)
 Gabriel Over the White House (1933) - General #1 (uncredited)
 The Defense Rests (1934) - Silent Judge (uncredited)
 The Man Who Reclaimed His Head (1934) - Minor Role (uncredited)
 Love Me Forever (1935) - Minor Role (uncredited)
 The Black Room (1935) - Member of the Court (uncredited)
 Diamond Jim (1935) - Stockbroker (uncredited) (final film role)

Writer
 Betty, the Boy and the Bird (1916)
 The Kid (1916)
 Corianton: A Story of Unholy Love (1931)

References

External links 

 
 Wilfred North; IBDb.com
 

1863 births
1935 deaths
Silent film directors
American male silent film actors
20th-century American male actors
English male silent film actors
20th-century English male actors
Male actors from London
English emigrants to the United States
English male stage actors